Scent Dance II ( 香之舞 II ) is a work
for solo violoncello, composed by He Xuntian in 2010.

Summary
Scent Dance II was commissioned for the 2010 3rd Beijing International Music 
Competition - Violoncello Competition and included in the list of required repertoire.

Inspiration 
Scent Dance II was inspired from Xuntian He’s poem Passing By the Earth (1999).

References

External links
Scent Dance II published by Schott Musik International, Germany

Compositions by He Xuntian
Solo cello pieces
2010 compositions